Borau is a municipality located in the province of Huesca, Aragon, Spain. According to the 2004 census (INE), the municipality has a population of 75 inhabitants. Borau consists of a dozen or so little houses, one Catholic church, and a little cafe.

References

Municipalities in the Province of Huesca